Loginovo is a rural locality (a village) in Vasilyevskoye Rural Settlement, Vashkinsky District, Vologda Oblast, Russia. The population was 4 in 2002.

Geography 
Vesnino is the nearest rural locality.

References 

Rural localities in Vashkinsky District